Resonance is a compilation album by the British rock band Anathema. It was released in 2001 as the first of two compilation albums featuring best-of as well as previously unreleased material, this one focusing on the band's softer music. It was followed by Resonance Vol. 2 in 2002.

Track listing

References

2001 compilation albums
Resonance
Albums with cover art by Travis Smith (artist)